The 1972 Memphis State Tigers football team represented Memphis State University (now known as the University of Memphis) as a member of the Missouri Valley Conference (MVC) during the 1972 NCAA University Division football season. In its first season under head coach Fred Pancoast, the team compiled an overall record of 5–5–1 record with a mark of 3–2 against conference opponents, tied for fourth place in the MVC, and outscored all opponents by a total of 265 to 254. The team played its home games at Memphis Memorial Stadium in Memphis, Tennessee. 

The team's statistical leaders included Al Harvey with 961 passing yards, Dornell Harris with 698 rushing yards, Stan Davis with 476 receiving yards, and Dan Darby with 42 points scored.

Schedule

References

Memphis State
Memphis Tigers football seasons
Memphis State Tigers football